Keigo Ōuchi (born 23 January 1930 – 9 March 2016) was a Japanese politician from the Democratic Socialist Party. He was Minister of Health and Welfare in the Hata Cabinet and Hosokawa Cabinet.

References 

1930 births
2016 deaths
20th-century Japanese women politicians
20th-century Japanese politicians
Ministers of Health and Welfare of Japan